Parliamentary elections were held in Bophuthatswana between 22 and 24 August 1977. The Bophuthatswana Democratic Party won 43 of the 48 elected seats in the National Assembly.

Electoral system
The National Assembly had a total of 96 seats, 48 of which were appointed and 48 elected.

Results

References

Bophuthatswana
Elections in Bophuthatswana
August 1977 events in Africa